La steppa is a 1962 Italian adventure film directed by Alberto Lattuada. It was entered into the 12th Berlin International Film Festival.

Cast
 Charles Vanel - Pére Christophore
 Daniele Spallone - Iégoruska
 Cristina Gaioni - La fille du fleuve (as Cristina Gajoni)
 Pavle Vuisić - Kuzmiciov (as Pavle Vuisic´)
 Marina Vlady - Comtesse Dranitsky
 Pero Kvrgić - Mossèi
 Michèle Bailly - La Gitane
 Ljuba Tadić - Jemelian (as Juba Tadic)
 Milan Bosiljcic
 Ljiljana Krstić
 Marianne Leibl
 Milorad Majic - Pantalei
 Natasha Petrova
 Hermina Pipinić - Olga Ivanovna
 Petar Prlicko
 Paolo Stoppa

External links

1962 films
Italian adventure films
1960s Italian-language films
1962 adventure films
Films directed by Alberto Lattuada
Films based on works by Anton Chekhov
Films set in Russia
1960s Italian films